Geosesarma dennerle is a species of small land-living crabs found on Java, Indonesia.

It is popular in the aquarium trade, where G. dennerle, in particular, is often simply called "Vampire Crab". Crabs called "Geosesarma bicolor Krakatau Vampirkrabbe" are probably also G. dennerle. All species of Geosesarma crabs are often called "vampire crabs" in the aquarium trade.

Geosesarma dennerle is, notably, seemingly more carnivorous than other species of Geosesarma, rarely feeding on plant material or decaying plant material

The species is named after the aquarium supply company Dennerle, which supported one of the describing authors' (Christian Lukhaup) study in Java.

The coloration of G. dennerle can be very similar to G. bicolor. The describing paper mentions chelipeds, male abdominal and G1 structures as distinguishing features.

Description 
Geosesarma dennerle is a member of the phylum Arthropoda, and subphylum Crustacea. This species resides in the genus Geosesarma de Man, which comprises 56 recognized species, commonly found in Southeast Asia. These crabs are generally between 1.5-2” in size. The crab features a two-colored carapace, being predominantly purple with a patch of cream/yellow on its back. Dennerle also possesses bright yellow eyes and vibrant violet claws.

As a member of the order Decapoda, this crab has 5 pairs of segmented limbs. Unlike some species of crab that have specialized claws, dennerle does not have swollen chellae. The carapace is described as square-esque in shape, with well defined regions of the shell, and the abdomen being broad. The ambulatory legs of this crab are generally long and thin, with broad segments. Dennerle often have tubercles along its dorsal carapace, providing some texture to the otherwise smooth shell.

G. dennerle are similar to other species of crabs with the occurrence of sexual dimorphism. The sex of Geosesarma species can be identified by observation of abdominal flaps. The males have narrow and pointed abdominal flaps, while the females possess wider flaps which are ovular in shape. Males are also noted to be slightly larger than females.

Ecology 
G. dennerle can be found natively on small islands in the Indian Ocean, such as Java, Sulawesi, Riau, and Krakatau, as well as throughout Asia.

As the prefix “geo-” suggests, G. dennerle is a terrestrial crab. It is common to find dennerle hiding in burrows in areas composed of muddy creek valleys, with rocks and dense vegetation. The diet of dennerle is greatly composed of insects and plant matter. The high endemism of species within the Geosesarma genus, means there is not a great amount of geographic distribution.

Reproduction 
Sexual reproduction in Geosesarma dennerle is similar to that of the majority of other species of crabs. Little has been observed towards specific variations in this species reproduction method in comparison to other species in the Geosesarma genus.

Members of the G. de Man genus commonly produce large eggs, averaging between 1.2 and 1.8 mm in diameter. Members of Geosesarma become sexually mature around 6 months of age, with breeding consisting of the male mounting the female to fertilize eggs. This species has direct development offspring: fully formed miniature versions of the adults hatch from the eggs. The female will carry around 20-80 fertilized eggs for about a month before hatching occurs. These newly hatched offspring are often independent, and will disperse from the point where they hatch.

Aquatic care 
G. dennerle, is popular in the aquarium industry for their bright coloration, and is part of a group of crabs nicknamed "Vampire Crabs". The lifespan of Vampire Crabs is said to be around two years in captivity or in the wild. These crabs require freshwater tanks that are at least 10 gallons in volume. Vampire Crabs are sensitive to radical changes in pH and water temperature. They require water that is close to a pH of 7 or 8, with water temperatures in the range of 70-82° Fahrenheit.

There are important temperaments of Geosesarma to understand in order to properly take care of them as pets. They are mostly nocturnal, remaining largely inactive during the day and becoming active at night time. In their tank these crabs prefer having hiding places, as they molt frequently early in their lifespan to grow. Vampire crabs are able to coexist with other species of crabs, but can be aggressive to crabs that are members of the same species or genus. Tank mates such as fish or other invertebrates are recommended to be of similar size, to prevent consumption of either the Vampire crabs or their tank mates.

Breeding in captivity 
Currently, there isn't any recommended technique to encourage breeding in captivity, as the behaviors of G. dennerle are widely unknown. It is recommended that new offspring, when hatched, are to be separated from the adults to prevent cannibalism. If new offspring are kept in the same tank, hiding places are recommended for them to increase survival rate.

References

External links

New species of “vampire crabs” (Geosesarma De Man, 1892) from central Java, Indonesia, and the identity of Sesarma (Geosesarma) nodulifera De Man, 1892 (Crustacea, Brachyura, Thoracotremata, Sesarmidae)

Grapsoidea
Freshwater crustaceans of Asia
Crustaceans described in 2015